Trenbolone undecanoate, or trenbolone undecylate, is a synthetic and injected anabolic–androgenic steroid (AAS) and a derivative of nandrolone (19-nortestosterone) which was never marketed. It is the C17β undecanoate (undecylate) ester and a long-acting prodrug of trenbolone. The drug was described by Roussel Uclaf in 1967 and was the first long-lasting ester of trenbolone to be developed. Subsequently, trenbolone hexahydrobenzylcarbonate, a roughly equivalent compound, was developed and introduced for use in humans in 1980, though it was discontinued in 1997. Trenbolone enanthate is another long-lasting ester of trenbolone. Similarly to trenbolone undecanoate, it was never marketed, but it has been sold on the black market as a designer steroid for bodybuilders and athletes.

See also
 List of androgen esters § Trenbolone esters

References

Further reading
 

Abandoned drugs
Androgen esters
Androgens and anabolic steroids
Estranes
Ketones
Prodrugs
Progestogens
Undecanoate esters
World Anti-Doping Agency prohibited substances